is a 1986 arcade game by Jaleco released only in Japan. The game was originally intended to be an Urusei Yatsura game, but for an unknown reason the license was not obtained for the arcade version—while the characters were changed, "Lum's Love Song" — the first opening theme of the first anime adaption, still loops throughout the game. However, the Family Computer port retained the license and was titled Urusei Yatsura: Lum's Wedding Bell. The game was re-released for mobile phones in Japan on February 28, 2006. Three mobile phone sequels, Momoko 1200%, Momoko 1200% in Machigai Sagashi and Momoko no Kasei Bowling ~La Mars Cup~, were released in Japan only in 2006.

Gameplay

This platform game features Momoko, a young Japanese girl who ages by several years each time the player reaches the next level. The goal for each level is to quickly climb several floors by escalator, ladder, or trampoline in the building she is in before the fire that is below her reaches her. These level settings start out from grade school settings to office type buildings. While jumping over obstacles, she must shoot various alien-like enemies that come after her on each floor. She can upgrade her weapon by destroying certain enemies as well as entering special hidden doorways which feature minigames which require you to jump obstacles. These doorways can also be used as a short-cut, and sometimes they are mandatory to be used in order to climb to the next floor. When Momoko reaches the top floor of a level, she must jump onto a small blimp flying above her to beat the level. Momoko begins as a four-year-old and ages through five levels. The final level is a bonus chance in which she is a twenty-year-old bride collecting items – the game concludes with her getting married, thus giving birth to a new Momoko and starting the cycle anew.

Urusei Yatsura: Lum's Wedding Bell
In , the player controls Lum as she grows up and has to avoid alien invaders while trying to reach her rescue UFO. The game's storyline involves a severe earthquake striking in Tomobiki-cho (the town where the Urusei Yatsura series takes place) and tearing the space-time continuum, forcing Lum to have to travel forward through time in order to be reunited with her "darling" Ataru Moroboshi.

The player starts out at infant school, then works her way to elementary school, junior high school, high school, college, and finally the player marries a bridegroom (Ataru) in a white tie outfit. After that, the game starts over again. The game has never been released outside Japan.

Reception 
In Japan, Game Machine listed Momoko 120% on their October 15, 1986 issue as being the tenth most-successful table arcade unit of the month.

References

External links
Scans of Urusei Yatsura: Lum's Wedding Bells' cartridge and instruction manual and some basic game information, at Rumic World

1986 video games
Arcade video games
City Connection franchises
Jaleco games
Tose (company) games
Japan-exclusive video games
Nintendo Entertainment System games
Platform games
School-themed video games
Urusei Yatsura
Video games developed in Japan
Video games based on anime and manga
Video games featuring female protagonists
Multiplayer and single-player video games